The Ussuri broadleaf and mixed forests ecoregion (WWF ID: PA0443) covers a mountainous areas above the lower Amur River and Ussuri River in Primorsky Krai and Khabarovsk Krai in the Russian Far East. The ecoregion is in the Palearctic realm, with a Humid Continental climate.

Location and description 
The ecoregion covers a "Z" shaped area in which the northern section is a 400 km band of forest north of Khabarovsk parallel to the Amur River (which is 20–30 km to the south), the vertical band of which parallels the Ussuri River (which is 20–30 km to the west) on the western slopes of the Sikhote-Alin Mountains, and the base of which is the eastern slope of the Sikhote-Alin in Primorsky Krai.

Climate 
The region has a Humid continental, cool summer climate (Koppen classification (Dwb)).  This climate is characterized by high variation in temperature, both daily and seasonally; with dry winters and cool summers.

Flora and fauna 
The Ussuri forests are the most biologically diverse in northern Asia. The maritime influence moderates the climate, precipitation is high enough to support rich forests, and the region is a boundary area between mountains, river flat lands, and sea coast.

The forests of the region are dominated by Korean pine and Mongolian oak. It is also home to the largest species of cat, the Siberian tiger.

Protections 
Notable protected areas of the Russian Federation in the ecoregion include:
 Bastak Nature Reserve, on the south-eastern spurs of the Bureya Range. (914 km2)
 Bolon Nature Reserve covering wetlands of the western approaches to Lake Bolon in the lower Amur River regions. (1,000 km2)
 Botcha Nature Reserve on the northeastern slopes of the Sikhote-Alin mountains. (2,674 km2)
 Komsomolsk Nature Reserve located where the Amur River cuts a narrow passage through the Sikhote-Alin. (643 km2)
 Khingan Nature Reserve includes forested spurs of the Lesser Khingan mountains. (940 km2)
 Sikhote-Alin Nature Reserve An IUCN class Ia "strict ecological reserve" (a Zapovednik). (4,016 km2)
 Ussurisky Nature Reserve, one of the remaining virgin mixed deciduous-conifer forests in the Primorsky (Maritime) region of the Russian Far East.  Located on the western slopes of the Sikhote-Alin mountains. (404 km2)
These are all IUCN class Ia "strict ecological reserves" (zapovedniks).

See also 
 List of ecoregions in Russia

References 

Ecoregions of Russia
Palearctic ecoregions
Ecoregions of Asia